George II Xiphilinos or Xiphilinus (? – 7 July 1198) was the Patriarch of Constantinople between 1191 and 1198 AD. According to Balsamon, George, during the reign of Alexios I Komnenos, added one member to the Exocatacoeli (an office similar to the Catholic cardinal in the Greek Church of the time), making it six.

References 

12th-century births
1198 deaths
12th-century patriarchs of Constantinople